Impatiens tinctoria, the dyers busy lizzie, is a species of flowering plant in the balsam family Balsaminaceae, native to tropical Africa.

Description
It has deeply-veined, elliptic, slightly toothed leaves. Large  hooded white flowers, with deep crimson splashes in the centres, hang from short stems in summer and autumn. The flowers are scented like gardenias. The stems and leaves are succulent and fleshy. 

Impatiens tinctoria is listed by the Plant List as "Unresolved", meaning that it has not yet been established as an accepted name or a synonym.

Cultivation
It prefers humid conditions which replicate its native habitat.

References

Flora of Eritrea
Flora of Ethiopia
Flora of South Sudan
Flora of Kenya
Flora of Tanzania
Flora of Uganda
Flora of the Democratic Republic of the Congo
Flora of Malawi
Flora of Zambia
tinctoria